Nicholas W. Orloff (1890s-1961) was a Russian immigrant to the United States and an agent of the New York KGB during World War II.  According to historian John Earl Haynes and Harvey Klehr's analysis of the Venona Cables, Orloff received a regular stipend from the KGB for his services, reporting information on immigrant groups to Soviet intelligence and acting as a talent-spotter for new sources. He also appeared on the August 17, 1958 episode of What's My Line?, where he is credited as a "United Nations Interpreter."

References

American spies for the Soviet Union
American people in the Venona papers
Espionage in the United States